Löwenstedt is a municipality in the district of Nordfriesland, in Schleswig-Holstein, Germany.  It is located 33Km south of Flensburg and the Danish border.

References

Municipalities in Schleswig-Holstein
Nordfriesland